"So Real" is the third single from Jeff Buckley's 1994 album Grace, and also had an accompanying video.

Michael Tighe, a guitarist who joined Buckley late in the recording of Grace, brought with him what was to become the main riff on "So Real" that is played during the verses.

"Forget Her" was originally on the album track list, but Buckley subsequently replaced it with "So Real". The former, while not appearing on the album, was subsequently released on the second disc of the 10th anniversary Legacy Edition of Grace and is also on the official Jeff Buckley site, with a recent video made of existing footage of Buckley while alive. This video is also found on the DVD that comes with the aforementioned Legacy Edition.

"''I love "So Real" because it's the actual quartet that you see in that picture right there that you have on the wall, on the album. And that one I produced live all one moment, the vocal is the first take, all one take. It was three o'clock in the morning."

Track listing
"So Real"
"Lost Highway"
"Tongue"

Notes

1995 singles
Jeff Buckley songs
Music videos directed by Sophie Muller
1994 songs
Columbia Records singles
Songs written by Jeff Buckley
Songs written by Michael Tighe
Art rock songs
American psychedelic rock songs